The Puerto Rican recording artist Ricky Martin has embarked on fourteen concert tours. His 1992 debut, Ricky Martin Tour was based in Latin America only and supported his first studio album Ricky Martin (1991). In 1993 and 1994, Martin embarked on his second Latin America tour, Me Amaras Tour  to further promote his second studio album Me Amaras (1993). In September 1995, he released his third studio album, A Medio Vivir. To further promote its material, Martin embarked on his third concert tour, the A Medio Vivir Tour, in October 1995. The tour lasted for more than two years, through which he performed 63 shows and visited Europe, Latin America and the United States. A DVD, titled Europa: European Tour was released on July 3, 2001. It features the show from his sold-out tour in Europe in 1997.

While on tour in 1997, Martin returned to the studio and began recording material for his fourth studio album. He said the experience of touring and recording at the same time was "brutal and incredibly intense". The album was titled Vuelve and released on February 12, 1998. For promotion, Martin embarked on a concert tour performing in Asia, South America, and the US. Martin's fifth concert tour, Livin' la Vida Loca Tour was in support of his first English-language studio album Ricky Martin (1999) and became his first major world concert tour. The tour started in October 1999 and continued until October 2000. It covered four continents, North America, Europe, Asia and Australia. Jessica Simpson was featured as an opening act on the North American leg of the tour.

After five years, in 2005, he began his sixth tour, One Night Only with Ricky Martin in support of his eighth studio album Life (2005). The tour visited the Americas, Europe, Asia and Africa, and comprised 53 show dates. In February 2007, Martin embarked on his seventh tour, Black and White Tour  to further promote his first live album MTV Unplugged (2006). The Música + Alma + Sexo World Tour was the eighth concert tour by Martin, and supported his ninth studio album, Música + Alma + Sexo (2011). It began with a series of concerts in Puerto Rico and North America, with international dates later in the year. After visiting 28 countries throughout North America, Europe and Latin America, Ricky Martin formally ended his tour on November 12, 2011 in his homeland, Puerto Rico, at the Coliseo de Puerto Rico José Miguel Agrelot. In October 2013, he began his ninth concert tour, Ricky Martin Live in Newcastle and continued throwing concerts in venues in the Americas in the later months, as well as participating in the Mawazine Festival in Rabat, Morocco.

In 2014, Martin embarked on his Mexico tour, Live in Mexico. In February 2015, he released his tenth studio album, A Quien Quiera Escuchar. To further promote its material, Martin embarked on his tenth concert tour, the One World Tour, in October 2015. The tour lasted for three years, through which he performed 105 shows and visited Oceania, North America, South America, Europe and Asia. His performance in Zócalo, Mexico City, was attended by more than 100,000 people, and is one of the highest-attended concerts of all time. In 2017, he headlined his first residency show, All In, which took place at the Park Theater at Monte Carlo Resort and Casino. In 2018, he started Ricky Martin en Concierto. Two years later, Martin announced his new album would be released in 2020 and he started his world tour, Movimiento Tour, on February 7, 2020. Because of the COVID-19 pandemic and subsequent personal experiences, Martin decided to split the tour's associated album in two extended plays, Pausa and Play, and postponed several of his tour dates. He has also planned to embark on a co-headlining tour with Spanish singer Enrique Iglesias. The tour will begin in Glendale, Arizona on September 3, 2021 and conclude in Orlando on October 30, 2021.

In addition to his tours and residencies, Martin has performed his songs on several television programs and awards shows, most notably his game-changer performance of The Cup of Life at the 41st Annual Grammy Awards, which is known as the greatest award show performance of all time by a Latin artist, and effectively ushered the "Latin explosion".

Concert tours

Co-headlining concert tours

Concert residencies

Notable concerts

Performances at award shows

References

Ricky Martin

Martin, Ricky